HK Spišská Nová Ves is a professional Slovak ice hockey club based in Spišská Nová Ves. They currently play in the Slovak Extraliga. The club is a four-time and current winner of the second highest competition Slovak 1. Liga, as it won in the 2020–21 season and advanced to Slovak Extraliga. They play their home games in Spiš Aréna in the eastern Slovak town Spišská Nová Ves. The team was established in 1932.

Honours

Domestic

Slovak 1. Liga
  Winners (4): 1995–96, 2001–02, 2008–09, 2020–21
  Runners-up (3): 2006–07, 2007–08, 2014–15
  3rd place (1): 2010–11

1st. Slovak National Hockey League
  Runners-up (1): 1990–91
  3rd place (1): 1991–92

Players

Current roster

Notable players

 Martin Štrbák
 Richard Lintner
 Martin Bakoš
 Július Hudáček
 Adam Jánošík
 Martin Bodák
 Adam Lapšanský
 Ľubomír Vaic
 Stanislav Jasečko
 Ladislav Karabin
 Libor Hudáček
 Denis Godla
 Pavol Skalický
 Radomír Heizer

Team name
 1932 – AC Spišská Nová Ves
 1950 – Lokomotíva Spišská Nová Ves
 1964 – Lokomotíva – Bane Spišská Nová Ves
 1973 – Železničiar – Stavbár Spišská Nová Ves
 1982 – Geológ – Stavbár Spišská Nová Ves
 1988 – Štart Spišská Nová Ves
 1992 – HK VTJ Spišská Nová Ves
 2002 – HK Spišská Nová Ves 
 2009 – HK Noves okná Spišská Nová Ves
 2010 – HK Spišská Nová Ves – current

References

External links
Official website 

Spisska Nova Ves, HK
Spisska Nova Ves, HK
Ice hockey clubs established in 1934
1934 establishments in Czechoslovakia